Julie Nicole Wojta (born April 9, 1989) is an American basketball player for Gernika KESB of the Liga Femenina (LFB). Wojta played college basketball at the University of Wisconsin–Green Bay, where she was a Wade Trophy and Wooden Award finalist, Horizon League tournament MVP, and a second-team All-America pick. Wojta was the first player from Green Bay drafted by a WNBA team, as well as the first to be named to an Associated Press All-American team.

Early life and career

High school 
Wojta hailed from Francis Creek, Wisconsin, and attended Mishicot High School, where she was a three-year starter on the basketball team. Wojta was a lauded player at Mishicot, receiving two years of all-county honors, two Manitowoc Herald Times Reporter Player of the Year awards, and two Olympian Conference Player of the Year awards. Wojta was also an Associated Press honorable mention selection for Wisconsin's all-state team after her junior year after leading Mishicot to a conference title.  Wojta also participated in track and field as a high school athlete.

College 
Wojta redshirted for her true freshman season, and led the team's redshirt freshmen the next year in total rebounds and free throw percentage. As a sophomore, she was a Second Team All-Horizon League selection, in addition to being a Horizon League Player of the Week. Wojta began her junior season as a preseason First Team All-Conference Selection, she would go on to finish the season as a Second Team All-Horizon League and All-Tournament selection.

In her final season, Wojta received many accolades. She was a preseason First Team All-Horizon League selection and would be named Horizon League Player of the Week four times. She finished the season named to the Horizon League's All-Defensive and First All-League Teams, and was the Horizon League's Player of the Year and Defensive Player of the Year, later capturing the Horizon League Tournament MVP Award. Wojta led the Horizon League in scoring and steals, and was a finalist for the John R. Wooden Award and Wade Trophy, but won neither. Wojta was later named an AP Second Team All-American, the first Green Bay women's basketball player to do so since the school became Division 1. She holds program records for most steals in a season (127) and most career double-doubles.

Professional 
Wojta was drafted by the Minnesota Lynx, becoming the first Green Bay player drafted by a WNBA team. However, she was cut after the 2012 training camp, proceeding to sign a contract to play with Dexia Namur in Belgium. In July, Wojta was brought back to the Lynx on a short-term contract to provide depth after a series of injuries.

Wotja made her WNBA regular-season debut on July 12, 2012, grabbing two rebounds in limited play. She was waived by the team in August, once the injured players returned to the team.

In 2013, Wojta was invited to training camp with the San Antonio Silver Stars, but was cut prior to the season. She was re-signed on June 5, 2013, to provide depth due to injuries. She made her debut with the Silver Stars on June 7, playing briefly in a win over the Chicago Sky.

WNBA career statistics

Regular season

|-
| align="left" | 2012
| align="left" | Minnesota
| 1 || 0 || 4.0 || .000 || .000 || .000 || 2.0 || 0.0 || 0.0 || 0.0 || 1.0 || 0.0
|-
| align="left" | 2013
| align="left" | San Antonio
| 3 || 0 || 8.3 || 1.000 || .000 || .667 || 2.0 || 0.3 || 1.0 || 0.0 || 1.0 || 2.0
|-
| align="left" | Career
| align="left" | 2 years, 2 teams
| 4 || 0 || 7.3 || .500 || .000 || .667 || 2.0 || 0.3 || 0.8 || 0.0 || 1.0 || 1.5

Green Bay statistics
Source

Accolades and awards

College  
 Horizon League Player of the Year (2012)
 Horizon League Defensive Player of the Year (2012)
 Associated Press Second Team All-American (2012)
 Horizon League Tournament MVP (2012)
 Horizon League All-Tournament Team (2011)
 Horizon League All-Defensive Team (2012)
 First Team All-Horizon League (2012)
 Second Team All-Horizon League (2010, 2011)
 Preseason First Team All-Horizon League (2010, 2011)
 Program record holder for single season steals (127)
 Program Division 1 record holder for career double-doubles (35)

High school   
 2 X Wisconsin All-county Honours
 2 X Olympian Conference Player of the Year 
 2 X Manitowoc Herald Times Reporter — Player of the Year 
 Associated Press Honourable Mention Wisconsin's All-state team (2006) 
 Olympian Conference Title as a junior, with an average 17.6 points and 13.0 rebounds a game
 All-conference Honourable Mention as a freshman, with an average 12.8 points and 8.3 rebounds a game

Europe 
 Lega Basket Femminile Eurobasket.com All-Italian A1 Defensive Player of the Year (2018) 
  Liga Femenina de Baloncesto Most Valuable Forward Player of the Year (2020) 
  Most Valuable Player (Maurizio Ferrara Prize, 2021)

References

External links
Green Bay Bio

1989 births
Living people
All-American college women's basketball players
American expatriate basketball people in Belgium
American women's basketball players
Basketball players from Wisconsin
Forwards (basketball)
Green Bay Phoenix women's basketball players
Guards (basketball)
Minnesota Lynx draft picks
Minnesota Lynx players
People from Manitowoc County, Wisconsin
San Antonio Stars players